This list is of the Places of Scenic Beauty of Japan located within the Prefecture of Tottori.

National Places of Scenic Beauty
As of 1 June 2020, six Places have been designated at a national level.

Prefectural Places of Scenic Beauty
As of 1 May 2019, eleven Places have been designated at a prefectural level.

Municipal Places of Scenic Beauty
As of 1 May 2019, eighteen Places have been designated at a municipal level.

Registered Places of Scenic Beauty
As of 1 June 2020, three Monuments have been registered (as opposed to designated) as Places of Scenic Beauty at a national level.

See also
 Cultural Properties of Japan
 List of Historic Sites of Japan (Tottori)
 List of Cultural Properties of Japan - paintings (Tottori)
 List of parks and gardens of Tottori Prefecture

References

External links
  Cultural Properties of Tottori Prefecture

Tourist attractions in Tottori Prefecture
Places of Scenic Beauty